Dylan Mbayo (born 11 October 2001) is a Belgian professional footballer who plays for Belgian First Division A club Kortrijk.

Early life
Born in Belgium, Mbayo is of Congolese descent. Mbayo is the son of retired footballer Marcel Kimemba Mbayo, who also played for Lokeren.

Club career
On 3 August 2021, he signed a five-year contract with Kortrijk.

References

External links

2001 births
Belgian people of Democratic Republic of the Congo descent
Living people
Belgian footballers
Belgium youth international footballers
Association football wingers
K.S.C. Lokeren Oost-Vlaanderen players
K.A.A. Gent players
K.V. Kortrijk players
Belgian Pro League players
Challenger Pro League players